St. Stephen-in-the-Fields Anglican Church is an Anglican Church of Canada parish church in the Kensington Market neighbourhood of Toronto, Ontario. It was the first Anglican church established in the city west of Spadina Avenue. St. Stephen's is known for a number of community outreach programs.

Designed by Thomas Fuller, later Chief Dominion Architect, in the Gothic Revival style, the church is designed under Part IV of the Ontario Heritage Act as being of significant cultural heritage value.

History

St. Stephen-in-the-Fields was founded in 1857 by Robert Brittain Denison. Denison, who paid for its construction in entirety, built the church as a parish for the farm workers on his estate, Bellevue House. Ground was broken on July 1, 1858, when the Hon. and Rt Rev. John Strachan, 1st Bishop of Toronto, laid the cornerstone. The church's name reflects its then rural setting. Denison employed the architectural firm of Fuller & Jones, who would later go on to design the Centre Block of Parliament Hill. John Worthington was the builder. The first service was held in the new church on Advent Sunday, November 28, 1858. The first incumbent was the Rev. James Henry McCollum, who later left after a feud with Denison. The church was consecrated on May 17, 1863, the Sunday after Ascension Day. 

The church was gutted by fire on October 26, 1865. The congregation met in a lecture hall at University College while the church was rebuilt by Henry Langley. The church was expanded by Richard Cunningham Windeyer, Sr. in 1872 and renovated by Eden Smith in 1890.

In 1927, the rector, the Rev. James Edward Ward, pioneered broadcasting services on CFRB and VE9GW. It was the first Canadian church to broadcast across the ocean and gained a large international following. Ward also wrote 75 religious plays for radio, many in collaboration with Earle Grey. Ward also wrote a weekly religious programme titled "The Way of the Spirit" on CBC Radio. 

In the 1980s, to raise necessary funds, the rectory, parish hall and surrounding property were sold and half the church was gutted and converted into a clinic for The Doctor’s Hospital. After the hospital vacated, the other half of the building has been rented out for community uses.

As one of the oldest Anglican churches in the city, the parish has been subdivided many times creating new parishes including St. Matthias, St. Thomas's and St. Mary Magdalene.

Architecture
The origin 1858 church was designed by Thomas Fuller, later Chief Dominion Architect, and Chilion Jones in the Gothic Revival style. The design was based on St Michael's Church, Longstanton. It is of red brick construction trimmed with grey stone. Fuller & Jones' church was gutted by fire in 1865 and rebuilt and enlarged by Henry Langley. None of Fuller's original interior survives, though on the exterior, the polychromatic masonry, solid buttressing and open bell core survive. The current chancel dates from an 1890 renovation by Eden Smith. 

The church is notable for its stained glass windows, some of which date from the 1860s. The windows were restored in 2018 at a cost of $80,000.

List of rectors
 1858 – 1861: The Rev. James Henry McCollum
 1861 – 1911: The Rev. Abraham James Broughall
 1912 – 1925: The Rev. Canon Thomas George Wallace
 1925 – 1958: The Rev. James Edward Ward
 1958 – 1968: The Rev. Canon Guy Marshall
 1968 – 1972: The Rev. John E. Speers
 1972 – 1982: The Rev. Campbell A. Russell
 1982 – 1988: The Rev. Ben Lochridge
 1988 – 2004: The Rev. Kevin Flynn
 2015 – present: The Rev. Canon Maggie Helwig

From 2004 to 2014, the parish was served by four priests-in-charge: the Rev. David Neelands (2004–2005); the Rev. Christian Swayne OHC (2005–2011); the Rev. David Bryan Hoopes OHC (2011–2013); and the Rev. Maggie Helwig, who began as priest-in-charge in May 2013 and was appointed rector in January 2015.

See also

 List of Anglican churches in Toronto
 Parkdale Deanery

References

Stephen-in-the-Fields Anglican Church, Saint
Stephen-in-the-Fields Anglican Church, Saint
Stephen-in-the-Fields Anglican Church, Saint
Gothic Revival architecture in Toronto
Churches completed in 1858
City of Toronto Heritage Properties
Thomas Fuller buildings
Kensington Market